Count Arnaldo Casella Tamburini, Jr. (January 24, 1885 - September 12, 1936) was an Italian artist who killed himself in Chicago, Illinois.

Biography
He was born in Florence, Italy on January 24, 1885, to Arnaldo Casella Tamburini, Sr.

He killed himself on September 12, 1936, in Chicago, Illinois when he jumped from a second story window at St. Luke's Hospital where he had been hospitalized for mental illness.

References

1885 births
1936 suicides
20th-century Italian painters
20th-century Italian male artists
Italian male painters
Suicides by jumping in the United States
Suicides in Illinois
19th-century Italian male artists
1936 deaths
Italian emigrants to the United States